Stephen Huss and Joseph Sirianni were the defending champions, but chose not to compete with each other.
Huss partnered up with Ashley Fisher, while Sirianni played alongside Fritz Wolmarans.
Vasek Pospisil and Bobby Reynolds won the title, defeating Go Soeda and James Ward 6–2, 6–4 in the final.

Seeds

Draw

Draw

References
 Main Draw
 Qualifying Draw

Tallahassee Tennis Challenger - Doubles
2011 Doubles